The Way of All Men is a 1930 American Pre-Code drama film directed by Frank Lloyd and starring Douglas Fairbanks Jr., Dorothy Revier and Noah Beery. It was produced and released by First National Pictures, a subsidiary of Warner Bros. The film was based on the story entitled "The Sin Flood", by Henning Berger and appeared as a silent in 1922 also directed by Frank Lloyd. In 1931, the studio remade the film in German as The Mask Falls.

Plot
Billy Bear (Fairbanks) is a broker's clerk who has recently been fired because some information has been leaked to a rival broker. Billy goes to work with the rival broker, offering him valuable information about his former employer. Fairbanks falls in love with his employer's daughter, Edna (Mathews), a wealthy socialite. Billy abandons his old girlfriend, Poppy (Revier), who is a showgirl.

One a hot summer's day, Billy goes to a luxurious underground bar, run by Stratton (Beery). A tornado descends on the town, the river rises, and suddenly they find themselves trapped in the bar by a break in the levee which pours the flood waters through the streets of the town, which is situated below sea level.

A number of people flee into the bar just before the steel flood doors are closed and locked tight, making the place air-tight and safe from water. The film now focuses on the people trapped in the bar and how they act when they are facing circumstances where they are all facing death in a matter of hours. The majority of the trapped people completely change their normal way of acting and attempt to make amends for the things they regret having done. Billy asks Poppy for her forgiveness and professes his love for her. The two brokers, who have been lifelong enemies, shake hands. An ex-minister converts a crooked politician who had destroyed his home. Stratton's bartender confesses to him that he has been stealing money from the cash register. Stratton confesses that perhaps he hasn't been paying his bartender as much as he should have.

As everyone begins to realize that their oxygen is running out, they decide to open the flood gates, preferring a quick death to a drawn-out one. When the gates are open, everyone is surprised to find that the sun is shining and they are free from danger. The majority of those that were trapped quickly return to their original traits and old enmities are renewed once again. Billy, however, does not go back on his promise of marrying Poppy and the two are happily united.

Cast
 Douglas Fairbanks Jr. as Billy Bear 
 Dorothy Revier as Poppy 
 Noah Beery as Stratton  
 Dorothy Mathews as Edna
 Robert Edeson as Swift
 Anders Randolf as Frazer
 Ivan F. Simpson as Higgins
 William Orlamond as Nordling
 Wade Boteler as Charlie
 William Courtenay as Preacher

Foreign-language versions
One foreign-language version of the 1930 version of The Way of All Men was produced. The German version was titled Die Maske fällt and was directed by William Dieterle.

Preservation status
No film elements are known to survive. Only stills and advertising material like lantern slides, lobby posters and window cards survive as visual elements. The soundtrack, which was recorded on Vitaphone disks, may survive in private hands.

See also
 List of lost films
 List of early Warner Bros. sound and talking features

References

External links
 

1930 films
1930s English-language films
Films directed by Frank Lloyd
Lost American films
American multilingual films
American black-and-white films
American drama films
1930 drama films
Warner Bros. films
1930 multilingual films
1930 lost films
1930s American films